Le Capuchin (1920) is a racehorse who won the Prix du Jockey Club June 10, 1923 at the Chantilly Racecourse and the Grand International d'Ostende at Ostend racecourse, Belgium, in 1924.

Palmarès 
 1925	Prix Boiard 	 	 
 1924	Grand International d'Ostende
 1924	Prix des Maréchaux 	 
 1924	Grand International d'Ostende 		 	 	 
 1923	Prix du Jockey Club
 1923	Prix Daru

Pedigree

See also 
 Illustration on Gallica

References

1920 racehorse births
Racehorses trained in France
Racehorses bred in France
Thoroughbred family 2